Robert Weber (born 25 November 1985) is an Austrian handball player for Füchse Berlin and the Austria men's national handball team.

References

External links

1985 births
Living people
People from Bregenz
Austrian male handball players
Expatriate handball players
Austrian expatriate sportspeople in Germany
Handball-Bundesliga players
Sportspeople from Vorarlberg